Chupiquiña (possibly from Aymara Chupikiña) is a volcano on the border of Chile and Peru, about  high. On the Chilean side it is situated in the Arica y Parinacota Region, Parinacota Province, and on the Peruvian side it lies in the Tacna Region, Tacna Province, Palca District. Chupiquiña lies southeast of Achacollo and south of the Huancune volcano, near the Chilean volcano named Tacora.

References 

Volcanoes of Peru
Volcanoes of Arica y Parinacota Region
Landforms of Tacna Region
Mountains of Peru
Mountains of Tacna Region
Five-thousanders of the Andes